Pokrovka is a rural locality (a selo), the administrative centre of and one of two settlements, in addition to Bulun, in Maysky Rural Okrug  of Amginsky District in the Sakha Republic, Russia. Its population as of the 2010 Census was 681; up from 668 recorded in the 2002 Census.

References

Notes

Sources
Official website of the Sakha Republic. Registry of the Administrative-Territorial Divisions of the Sakha Republic. Amginsky District. 

Rural localities in Amginsky District